Lesbian, gay, bisexual, transgender and queer (LGBTQ) people face difficulties in prison such as increased vulnerability to sexual assault, other kinds of violence, and trouble accessing necessary medical care. While much of the available data on LGBTQ inmates comes from the United States, Amnesty International maintains records of known incidents internationally in which LGBTQ prisoners and those perceived to be lesbian, gay, bisexual or transgender have suffered torture, ill-treatment and violence at the hands of fellow inmates as well as prison officials.

One US-based human rights organization describes LGBTQ inmates as "among the most vulnerable in the prison population." In California prisons, two-thirds of LGBTQ people report that they were assaulted while incarcerated. The vulnerability of LGBTQ prisoners has led some prisons to separate them from other prisoners, while in others they are housed with the general population.

Historically, LGBTQ people in the United States have been socially and economically vulnerable due to their queer status. Policy, policing and the criminal justice system have historically perpetrated violence upon marginalized populations, like the queer community. This along with criminalizing same sex behaviors have created a disproportion of LGBTQ people in prisons.

Rates of imprisonment
In the United States, LGBTQ individuals are incarcerated at a higher rate than the general population.

An analysis of data collected between 2011 and 2012 found that same-sex attracted adults were incarcerated at a rate of 1,882 per 100,000, more than triple the national average. This discrepancy was largely driven by a large overrepresenation of gay and bisexual women. The rate of gay or bisexual men in the prison and jail population (5.5% and 3.3%, respectively) was close to the national rate (3.6%), but the rate among women (33% in prisons and 26.4% in jails) was around 8 to 10 times higher than the national baseline. Similar patterns have been observed among Australian prisoners.

As of 2015, the National Center for Transgender Equality estimated that one in six transgender individuals in the United States has been incarcerated in their lifetime, whereas the Bureau of Justice Statistics estimates a rate of one in twenty for the overall population.

Coming out
Many LGBTQ inmates who are able, even those who are openly gay outside of prison, stay in the closet with their sexual identities while imprisoned, because inmates who are known or perceived as gay, especially gay men with stereotypical effeminate characteristics, face "a very high risk of sexual abuse".

The Los Angeles County Men's jail segregates openly gay and transgender inmates, however, only if they are openly gay and if the staff that is inspecting them perceives them to be gay or trans enough for segregation. Even through attempts from gay and trans men trying to seek a safer place, the jail only segregates those that fit into their definition of gay and trans, often only accepting those they deem vulnerable enough.

LGBTQ individuals are often subject to physical violence when they attempt to resist sexual abuse or sexual degradation, and can be targeted due to perceived femininity as well as if their sexual orientation is known. These individuals can be targeted because of their sexuality and attitudes towards LGBTQ people. In some instances, LGBTQ prisoners who are outed have been punished for attempting to repel an alleged aggressor, sometimes ending up in solitary confinement.

Denial of access to surgical sex reassignment on the grounds of unstable or criminal behavior condemns those who are transgender, resulting in potential continuing identity confusion, low self-esteem, drug and alcohol abuse, self-mutilation and acting out behavior which further facilitates the vicious cycle of chronic dysfunction, perpetuating criminal behavior.

Transgender issues
Some organizations that used to focus on women's issues have expanded to include transgender people and gender non-conforming people in their work. Certain actions can and do improve the lives of trans prisoners. The papers "Transitioning Our Prisons Toward Affirmative Law: Examining the Impact of Gender Classification Policies on U.S. Transgender Prisoners" and "The Treatment of Transgender Prisoners, Not Just an American Problem – A Comparative Analysis of American, Australian, and Canadian Prison Policies Concerning the Treatment of Transgender Prisoners and a 'Universal' Recommendation To Improve Treatment" maintain that individuals should always be addressed and placed based on their gender identity rather than their genitalia.

Australia
The bill mentioned in "Transgender Prisoners: A Critical Analysis of Queensland Corrective Services' New Procedure" has shown to be largely ineffective.

Canada 
When Bill C-16, a bill that prevented discrimination based on gender identity, was passed in Canada, transgender prisoners were to be placed in facilities based on their gender identity. Additionally, Prime Minister Justin Trudeau promised to "look at" transgender prison assignment to ensure that these prisoners ended up in the facilities that matched their gender identity. Further, transgender prisoners are to be considered for sex-reassignment surgery if they are imprisoned for more than twelve continuous months.

Italy
In 2010 it was reported that Italy was to open its first transgender prison at Pozzale, a decision welcomed by gay rights groups. , the prison has not been created yet.

Japan 
One in 13 Japanese people identify as LGBT, or about 7.6% of the population. Japan does not criminalize same-sex sexual acts, and transgender people are able change their gender through the Family Registry if certain conditions are met. However these conditions include requiring “gender confirmation surgery, being over 20 years old, being unmarried while applying to legally change one's gender, having no minor children, and being deprived of their reproductive organ or reproductive ability” according to Amnesty International. If a person has not legally registered to change their gender before being incarcerated, they will be sent a prison that matches their gender assignment at birth. Additionally Japanese prisons are not required to provide hormone therapy for transgender inmates; since the medication isn't to treat a disease, the prisons aren't required by law to treat them. According to Amnesty International “Japan's Act on Penal Detention Facilities and Treatment of Inmates and Detainees (Act on Penal Detention) does not have specific clauses that cover the treatment of detainees based on sexual orientation or gender identity”. However Article 34.2 of Act on Penal Detention requires that female prison officers examine female detainees, and the practice is also extended to transgender women regardless of their status with gender confirmation surgery or not.

United Kingdom
In 2019, the Ministry of Justice (United Kingdom) published data on transgender incarceration in England and Wales:
there were 163 transgender prisoners (up from 139 reported in 2018), with 62 of the 121 jails housing at least one transgender prisoner.
Prisoners are included in the data if they are being considered by a transgender case board, and known to be living in or presenting as a gender different from their sex assigned at birth.
These figures may be underestimates in part because they do not include prisoners holding Gender Recognition Certificates under the Gender Recognition Act 2004.

In 2022, there were 230 transgender prisoners in Britain, increasing from 197 in 2021. In August 2022, a statement was issued by the Ministry of Justice under Dominic Raab, that trans prisoners would be sent to prisons based on their genitalia.

United States

Housing 
Most U.S. prisons have a policy of housing prisoners according to their sex as assigned at birth or genital configuration (e.g. post-op trans women would be placed in women's prisons), regardless of their current appearance or gender identity. Transgender women with breasts may be locked up with men, leaving them vulnerable to violence and sexual assault, as occurred with the case of Dee Farmer, a pre-operative transgender woman with breast implants, who was raped and contracted HIV when she was housed in a men's prison. Transgender men housed in women's prisons also face abuse, often more from guards than other inmates.

U.S. prisons generally view gender and sex as binary; this includes prison dress codes, which prevent gender-nonconforming individuals from dressing to match their gender identity. There is often little gender-confirming healthcare provided. While transgender prisoners used to be permitted to be housed according to the gender with which they identify, this rule was reversed, as announced by the U.S. Bureau of Prisons in May 2018. Now, housing is once again to be determined by biological sex.

In 2013, Harris County, Texas adopted a policy intended to protect and assure equal treatment of gay, lesbian, bisexual and transgender inmates, which allowed individuals to be housed based on their gender identity. The policy also outlined how inmates are searched. It included a "safe zone project," meant to endorse a "positive relationship of solidarity" between the sheriff's department and the gay community. Another policy states that members of the transgender community will be referred to by their chosen name, even if it has not legally been changed, both when spoken to and on their identifications bracelets. The sheriff's office in Harris County has a training and certification program for staff members to be designated as "gender classification specialists," giving them authorization to discuss gender issues with inmates.

The New York State prison system (DOCCS) has revised policies in recent years to reflect transgender and nonbinary people's gender identities. In January 2022, New York Governor Kathy Hochul directed the prison administrators to let transgender people choose to be housed in a men's or women's facility, and to give access to appropriate medical and mental health care. In 2019, New York DOCCS allowed the first transgender woman to transfer, prior to gender reassignment surgery, from a men's to a women's prison.

Healthcare 
Some courts in the US have ruled that hormone replacement therapy is a necessary medical treatment to which transgender prisoners are entitled. In the early 2000s, California Medical Facility, Vacaville, provided this medical treatment for male-to-female prisoners. Additionally, access to psychological counseling and to supportive underclothing like bras can help individuals live as the gender with which they self-identify.

In 1992, UC Irvine researchers published an article detailing medical experiments performed on every trans female inmate in the California state prison system, ending with all subjects being indefinitely taken off hormone therapy. The authors wrote: "withdrawal of therapy was also associated with adverse symptoms in 60 of the 86 transsexuals. Rebound androgenization, hot flashes, moodiness, and irritability or depression were the most frequent complaints." At the time, no right to access gender appropriate care existed in California state prisons.

In June 2019, Layleen Polanco, a transgender woman of color, died of an epileptic seizure in solitary confinement on Rikers Island. Guards had noticed that she was unresponsive but waited 90 minutes to seek help. A year later, it was reported that 17 corrections officers would be disciplined as a result of the incident.

Demographics 
In 2011, the National Transgender Discrimination Survey found that 35% of black transgender Americans believe that they have been incarcerated simply due to perceived anti-trans bias, compared to 4% of white transgender respondents. Black transgender people had higher rates of experiences of incarceration in general (47% compared to 12% of white transgender people). It also found that black trans women were sexually assaulted in jail at a rate of 38%, compared to 12% of white trans women prisoners.

Vietnam 
In 2015, the National Assembly of Vietnam passed a law which allows transgender people who have done sex reassignment surgery to register under their preferred gender. Further discussion on the treatment of LGBTQ+ people has been initiated in many later meetings of the National Assembly, in which representatives suggested that homosexual and transgender inmates be placed in different places than others. These suggestions were written into law in the 2019 Criminal Code of Vietnam, which went into effect on January 1, 2020. Many attorneys and advocacy groups have praised this as a new step towards ensuring the rights of Vietnamese trans people, while others point out that the law needs amendments that clearly define what these separate areas are like.

According to the new Criminal Code, beside groups like minors, foreigners, and mothers who carry their children of under 36 months into jail along with them, "inmates that are homosexual, transgender or people of unidentified gender can be imprisoned separately." Due to the lack of coverage regarding non-binary people in Vietnam, the phrase "people of unidentified gender" is best understood as trans men or trans women who have not undergone sex reassignment surgery, while "transgender" refers to those who have.

Conjugal visits

A conjugal visit is a scheduled extended visit during which an inmate of a prison is permitted to spend several hours or days in private with visitors, usually family members, in special rooms, trailers or even decorated, apartment-like settings on prison grounds. While the parties may engage in sexual intercourse, in practice an inmate may have several visitors, including children, as the generally recognized basis for permitting such a visit is to preserve family bonds and increase the chances of success for a prisoner's eventual return to life outside prison. Laws on conjugal visits vary widely by country from a total prohibition to very permissive policies. In jurisdictions where there is some form of recognition of same-sex relationships, prisoners may be permitted conjugal visits with a same-sex partner. In the United States, conjugal visits are allowed only in four states: California, Connecticut, New York and Washington.

Same-sex conjugal visitation by country

Argentina
Opposite-sex conjugal visits have long been permitted, but a case in the central province of Córdoba has authorized same-sex conjugal visits as well. The ruling came after an inmate was twice punished with solitary confinement for having sex with his visiting partner in his cell. The inmate brought a lawsuit on the basis of a law that obliges authorities to "guarantee (the availability of) intimate relations for prisoners with their spouses or, alternatively, with their (partners)."

Australia
In Australia, conjugal visits are only permitted in the Australian Capital Territory and Victoria. This includes visits by partners of the same-sex, provided they are not also incarcerated. Conjugal visits of any type are not allowed in New South Wales, Queensland, South Australia, Tasmania, Western Australia and the Northern Territory.

Belgium
Both men and women are entitled to conjugal visitation as heterosexual couples. Belgium's prisons provide facilities where inmates can meet their spouses once a month for a maximum of two uninterrupted hours. There are however circumstances, as they apply to heterosexual couples as well, where these conjugal visits can be revoked.

Brazil
In February 2015 inmates who register their same sex partner have the right to conjugal visitations in all of Brazil's jails. This decision was reached by the National Criminal and Penitentiary Council. The conjugal visit must be guaranteed at least once a month and cannot be prohibited or suspended as a disciplinary measure with the exception of certain cases where violations being restricted are linked to the improper use of conjugal visitations.

Canada
All inmates, with the exception of those on disciplinary restrictions or at risk for family violence, are permitted "Private Family Visits" of up to 72 hours' duration once every two months. Eligible visitors, who may not themselves be prison inmates, are: spouse, or common-law partner of at least six months; children; parents; foster parents; siblings; grandparents; and "persons with whom, in the opinion of the institutional head, the inmate has a close familial bond." Food is provided by the institution but paid by the inmates and visitors, who are also responsible for cleaning the unit after the visit. During a visit, staff members have regular contact with the inmate and visitors.

Caribbean region
Conjugal visits are not permitted in the Caribbean. Marcus Day, adviser to the Association of Caribbean Heads of Corrections and Prison Services has urged the implementation of opposite-sex conjugal visitation for male inmates and the provision of condoms within prisons in an effort to stop the spread of HIV. Day attributes the spread of HIV/AIDS in prisons to "homosexual relationships among otherwise heterosexual men and homosexual rape," situations he said are rife in Caribbean prisons:"Allow men to have the women come and visit them in prison and have a private room where they can make love to each other and the desire to have same-sex relationships will be greatly reduced," claimed Day.

Colombia
On October 11, 2001, the Colombian Supreme Court issued a verdict in favour of the right to same-sex conjugal visits in a case brought by Alba Nelly Montoya, a lesbian in the Risaralda Women's Prison. This was not the first case regarding same-sex conjugal visitation in the country. Marta Alvarez, another lesbian inmate, had been campaigning since 1994 for the same right, and on October 1, 1999 her case became the first ever sexual orientation-related case presented before the Inter-American Commission on Human Rights. In her petition, Alvarez had argued that her rights to personal dignity, integrity, and equality were being infringed upon by the denial to allow her conjugal visits in prison, since the Colombian National Penitentiary and Prison Institute (INPEC) granted conjugal visitation rights in a discriminatory fashion to heterosexual men and women (the latter restricted to visits from husbands only), and denied this right to same-sex couples.

While the Colombian government admitted its failure to grant conjugal visitation to Alvarez constituted "inhuman and discriminatory" treatment, it continued to deny such visits, arguing reasons of security, discipline, and morality. Alvarez was also subjected to retaliatory disciplinary measures, including being transferred to a men's prison, which ceased following a domestic and international protest campaign.

Costa Rica
In August 2008, the Costa Rican Constitutional Tribunal rejected a man's appeal in a lawsuit against prison authorities who stopped his conjugal visits to his male partner, a current inmate, ruling that gay inmates do not have the right to conjugal visits. In 2011, the court rejected this ruling and now allows same-sex conjugal visits.

Israel
Gay prisoners in Israeli Prison System (IPS) are allowed conjugal visits with their partners under the same circumstances as heterosexual prisoners. This policy was revised in July 2013 under Association for Civil Rights in Israel chief legal attorney Dan Yakir challenged the lack of conjugal visits for same sex inmates since 2009.

Mexico
In July 2007 through the efforts of the country's National Human Rights Commission (CDHDF), the Mexico City prison system began allowing same-sex conjugal visits on the basis of a 2003 law which bans discrimination based on sexual orientation. The visitor is not required to be married to the inmate. This policy change applies to all Mexico City Prisons.

Russia
Same-sex long or official visits are prohibited, but short visits for friends can be organised if one is imprisoned in a so-called kolonija-poselenie. Official sex in prison is possible only during the 1–3 day long visit of a registered heterosexual spouse.

United Kingdom
Conjugal visits are not allowed to any prisoner regardless of sexual orientation, but home visits are.

United States
In June 2007, the California Department of Corrections announced it would allow same-sex conjugal visits. The policy was enacted to comply with a 2005 state law requiring state agencies to give the same rights to domestic partners that heterosexual couples receive. The new rules allow for visits only by registered married same sex couples or domestic partners who are not themselves incarcerated. Further, the same sex marriage or domestic partnership must have been established before the prisoner was incarcerated. In April 2011, New York adopted to allow conjugal visits for currently married, or civil-union spouses same-sex partners.

Health care among LGBTQ prisoners by country

United States

Gender-affirming healthcare for transgender and nonbinary people
According to Masen Davis of the Transgender Law Center, LGBTQ people in prisons often face barriers in seeking basic and necessary medical treatment, exacerbated by the fact that prison health care staff are often not aware of or trained on how to address those needs. Incarcerated people in the United States have a constitutional right to healthcare, and incarcerated transgender people can assert legal challenges under the 8th Amendment to access gender-affirming and gender-transition-related care under the framework first articulated in Estelle v. Gamble. The Supreme Court ruled in Farmer v. Brennan (1994) that under the cruel and unusual punishment clause of the Eighth Amendment, prison officials cannot be deliberately indifferent towards blatant abuse directed against transgender prisoners. Eighth Amendment claims can be brought either under 42 U.S.C. § 1983 for state prisoners or under a Bivens action to address deliberate indifference and denial of healthcare in federal prisons.

Defining gender-affirming care

Gender-affirming care can be understood as encompassing both medical (non-surgical), social, and surgical interventions. Under the World Professional Association of Transgender Health (WPATH) “Standards of Care for the Health of Transsexual, Transgender, and Gender Nonconforming People,” gender-affirming healthcare is broadly defined as “primary care, gynecologic and urologic care, reproductive options, voice and communication therapy, mental health services (e.g., assessment, counseling, psychotherapy), and hormonal and surgical treatments.” Gender-affirming healthcare is widely regarded as a "life-saving" practice" both by physicians and members of the transgender and nonbinary community. Medical scholarship also recognizes that this "treatment is critical to maintain the health and safety of inmates, as without it, transgender prisoners may fall into deeper depression and have greater risk of life-threatening autocastration".

Legal overview of federal court decisions on gender-affirming care

Various courts have addressed the constitutionality of denying transgender people in prison gender-affirming care, including hormone therapy, mental healthcare, gender confirmation surgery, and grooming. Several U.S. Circuit Court of Appeals have held that the prison’s duty to treat serious illnesses includes the treatment of gender dysphoria. Other Circuits have held that prison bans on hormonal therapies constitute deliberate indifference in violation of the 8th Amendment. There is some disagreement among Circuits as to whether denial of gender confirmation surgery constitutes deliberate indifference. Some lower courts have affirmed that prohibitions on gender-affirming healthcare are also unconstitutional.

Freeze-frame policies 
Freeze-frame policies prevent incarcerated trans people from receiving gender-affirming healthcare, particularly hormone therapy, unless they were already receiving this healthcare prior to their incarceration. Under these policies, trans inmates may not start or expand their treatment while incarcerated. As a result, even a state that is legally bound to offer gender-affirming healthcare to trans inmates may deny that healthcare to someone who was not transitioning before being incarcerated. In other words, freeze-frame policies are much more common than outright bans on hormone therapy for incarcerated people. These policies continue to exist in several U.S. states and have been repealed in others. One obstacle in challenging these policies is that prison policy is determined largely at the state level; as a result, freeze-frame policies have been repealed piecemeal in each state in response to individual lawsuits. Several important cases have challenged freeze-frame policies in the Federal Bureau of Prisons, Georgia, and Missouri. Critics note that these policies rely on the assumption that transness and one's desire or comfort in seeking gender-affirming healthcare is static and fixed.

Ending freeze-frame policies, however, does not guarantee that incarcerated trans people will receive gender-affirming healthcare. Rather, the decisions in each of the cases challenging freeze-frame policies require that prisons conduct individualized assessments of inmates experiencing gender dysphoria. Hormone therapy is not always the treatment offered or deemed necessary following these assessments. In cases challenging these policies, the trans plaintiffs experienced severe mental health crises as a result of being denied care; courts weighed this risk of suicide and self-harm in determining whether hormone therapy was medically necessary for the plaintiffs. Additionally, trans inmates who do receive hormone therapy still do not have control over their healthcare decisions, as prison healthcare officials set dosages and treatment plans for inmates. On the whole, courts ending freeze-frame policies only intervene to ensure that prison policy does not constitute cruel and unusual punishment, leaving a significant gap between constitutionally permissible healthcare and healthcare that enables trans inmates to flourish and act with self-determination.

One of the earliest challenges to a freeze-frame policy came in 2011 in Adams v. Federal Bureau of Prisons. Vanessa Adams, a trans woman incarcerated in a federal prison, was diagnosed while incarcerated with Gender Identity Disorder (GID). Each of her 19 requests for treatment were denied under the BOP’s freeze-frame policy. As a result, Adams attempted suicide and self-harm multiple times. In 2009, the National Center for Lesbian Rights, Gay and Lesbian Advocates and Defenders, Florida Institutional Legal Services, and Bingham McCutchen LLP challenged the policy in court. In 2011, the Obama administration settled with Adams. The settlement ended freeze-frame policies in all federal prisons, ensuring that trans inmates would receive individualized assessments and treatment plans for gender dysphoria.

In 2015, Ashley Diamond, a trans woman incarcerated in Georgia, sued the state for failing to provide hormone therapy under a freeze-frame policy and for failing to protect Diamond from sexual assault while incarcerated. She was represented by the Southern Poverty Law Center. Diamond had been undergoing hormone therapy for 17 years prior to her 2012 arrest, but because her intake forms failed to identify her as trans, the Georgia DOC’s freeze-frame policy disqualified her from continued treatment. The conditions of her incarceration resulted in multiple self-harm and suicide attempts. Diamond v. Owens was significant because for the first time, the federal government stepped in to comment on states’ legal requirements to provide gender-affirming healthcare. The U.S. Department of Justice released a statement in support of Diamond, stating that in Diamond’s case, gender dysphoria required medically necessary treatment. Notably, the DOJ did not state unequivocally that prisons must provide hormone therapy. Rather, the DOJ argued that “proscriptive freeze-frame policies are facially unconstitutional under the Eighth Amendment because they do not provide for individualized assessment and treatment.” Within a week of the DOJ intervention, Georgia ended its freeze-frame policy, committing instead to individually assess inmates’ gender dysphoria and provide treatment accordingly. The court case, during which prison officials used incorrect pronouns in reference to Diamond, continued after this announcement, resulting in the Georgia DOC adopting a sexual assault prevention policy.

Jessica Hicklin, a trans woman from Missouri, was incarcerated at the age of 16 and sentenced to life in prison. At the age of 37, Hicklin challenged the Missouri Department of Corrections freeze-frame policy, claiming that it violated the 8th Amendment cruel and unusual punishment clause; Lambda Legal represented Hicklin in Hicklin v. Precynthe. Hicklin noted that at 16, she did not know what gender dysphoria was or have the resources to begin transitioning. In 2018, a federal court sided with Hicklin and ordered the Missouri DOC to provide Hicklin with gender-affirming healthcare in the form of hormone therapy, as well as other commissary products to help Hicklin socially transition. Hicklin v. Precynthe effectively ended Missouri’s freeze-frame policy, giving incarcerated trans people greater access to gender-affirming care across the state.

Canada 
On August 31, 2001, the Canadian Human Rights Tribunal concluded that Sections 30 and 31 of the Correctional Service of Canada contained discrimination on the basis of sex and disability in Canadian Human Rights Act after Synthia Kavanagh, a trans woman sentenced for life in 1989 for 2nd-degree murder, was sent to an institution for males. This institution assignment occurred despite the trial judge's recommendation that Synthia, as a trans woman, serve her sentence in a facility for women. Further, Synthia was denied sex reassignment surgery and hormones. The institutional policy, at the time, only facilitated cases which addressed conditions in which, reasonably, the plaintiff would seek sexual reassignment after the period of incarceration. Due to Synthia Kavanagh's life sentence, this was not a foreseeable option. "The decision to discontinue hormones in 1990 seems to have been based on the complainant's life sentence which made her, according to Dr. R. Dickey, apparently ineligible for ultimate reassignment. ... the diagnosis of transsexualism has been clearly established in this case" by expert witness testimony, throughout her trial, "She [had] responded well to feminizing effects of cross-gender hormones and has experienced no significant side effects. As established by legal precedent and confirmed by policy in Canadian and British Columbia Corrections Service, the complainant was entitled to continue her hormone treatment".

In Petitioning the Canadian Human Rights Tribunal, Kavanagh argued that "The Correctional Service of Canada has discriminated and continues to discriminate against me because of my disability and sex (Transsexualism), contrary to Section 5 of the Canadian Human Right Act, by refusing to provide me with necessary medical and surgical treatment." Kavanagh continues to elaborate on her transition prior to imprisonment in this address, stating "since 1981 I have been diagnosed as a transsexual, which means that my gender is female but my sex is male. For 13 years, I was on estrogen hormonal treatment and lived as a woman, in preparation for my sex reassignment surgery to correct my medical disorder. In May 1990, my hormonal treatment was discontinued." After incarceration in a men's facility Kavanagh "repeatedly asked the CSC to arrange for evaluation for sex reassignment surgery, for the surgery to be performed and my consequent transfer to a women's institution." The discontinuation of hormone treatment and rejection of proposed sex reassignment surgery, paired with the continuation of periods of solitude prompted Kavanagh to respond "I believe that the CSC Policy discriminates against transsexuals, as the policy does not recognize the need for the continuation of medical treatment at the onset of incarceration, nor does the policy acknowledge the psychological need to be imprisoned with other members of one's psychological sex at the time of incarceration."

The issue of surgical reassignment has worrying implications for incarcerated transgender people. Individuals serving life sentences or other periods of prolonged incarceration may be less able to "prove" that they live socially as their gender; because this is a requirement to qualify for surgical reassignment, it constitutes a serious institutional barrier for transsexual people attempting to access gender-affirming care.

Hungary 

Hungary has compulsory HIV testing, which is part of the Ministry of Health regulations, which requires prostitutes, homosexuals, and prisoners be tested for HIV. When prisoners are found to be HIV positive they are taken to a special unit in Budapest. Units for HIV positive prisoners are staffed with individuals who are trained and who understand the problems of HIV. Specialized treatment of HIV are only available at one hospital in Budapest. HIV treatment for prisoners is paid for by the state-owned National Health Insurance Fund. These prisoners have their own cells with their own showers, a community room with games, and a social worker available to them. Post test counseling is also provided.

LGBT youth prisoners in the United States

According to some studies, LGBT youth are particularly at risk for arrest and detention. Jody Marksamer, Shannan Wilber, and Katayoon Majd, writing on behalf of the Equity Project, a collaboration between Legal Services for Children, the National Center for Lesbian Rights, and the National Juvenile Defender Center, say that LGBT youth are over represented in the populations of youth who are at risk of arrest and of those who are confined in juvenile justice facilities in the United States.

Many LGBT youth often experience being cast aside from their families and hostile environments while at school. The school system fails many LGBT students through their zero-tolerance policy which is meant to protect them but often results in LGBT students being arrested or given harsh disciplinary action. According to "Messy, Butch, and Queer: LGBTQ Youth and the School-to-Prison Pipeline", LGBT youth are often blamed for the harassment they receive despite the fact that they are being targeted solely upon their sexual orientation or the way the LGBT students present themselves.

Queer youth are also socially and economically vulnerable, especially in regards to high rates of homelessness. This vulnerability can lead to illegal behavior, and also over policing when homeless, creating an over representation of LGBT youth in prisons. See Homelessness among LGBT youth in the United States, and LGBT youth vulnerability.

A brief by the Center for American Progress found that each year approximately 300,000 gay, trans, and gender nonconforming youth are arrested or detained each year, 60% of whom are Black or Hispanic. These queer youth make up 13–15 percent of the juvenile incarceration system, compared to their overall population of 5–7 percent. Similar to how transgender adults are often placed into solitary confinement, allegedly for their own protection, these youth are "protected" in the same way. Often, however, it is because they are seen as sexual predators rather than potential victims. Courts also commonly assign queer youth to sex offender treatment programs even when convicted of a non-sexual crime. "As 12% of adjudicated youth in juvenile facilities reported experiencing sexual abuse in 2009” according to a report from the Juvenile Law Center.

Physical and sexual abuse
According to Amnesty International, globally, LGBT prisoners and those perceived to be LGBT, are at risk of torture, ill-treatment and violence from other inmates as well as prison officials. Amnesty International cites numerous cases internationally where LGBT inmates are known to have been abused or murdered by prison officials or fellow inmates.

Statistics show that 59% of transgender women in male prisons had been sexually assaulted while incarcerated compared to the 4% of the male-identified population. Transgender women in male prisons also deal with the risk of forced prostitution by both prison staff and other prisoners. Forced prostitution can occur when a correction officer brings a transgender woman to the cell of a male inmate and locks them in so that the male inmate can rape her. The male inmate will then pay the correction officer in some way and sometimes the correction officer will give the woman a portion of the payment.

"[P]risoners fitting any part of the following description are more likely to be targeted: young, small in size, physically weak, gay, first offender, possessing "feminine" characteristics such as long hair or a high voice; being unassertive, unaggressive, shy, intellectual, not street-smart, or "passive"; or having been convicted of a sexual offense against a minor. Prisoners with any one of these characteristics typically face an increased risk of sexual abuse, while prisoners with several overlapping characteristics are much more likely than other prisoners to be targeted for abuse."

In the United States 
Gay and bisexual men are often assumed to be responsible for the preponderance of sexual assaults perpetrated in prisons as has been reflected in various American judicial decisions. For example, in Cole v. Flick the court upheld the right of prisons to limit the length of inmates' hair, claiming that allowing them to wear long hair could lead to an increase in attacks by "predatory homosexuals". In Roland v. Johnson, the court described "gangs of homosexual predators". And Ashann-Ra v. Virginia contains references to "inmates known to be predatory homosexuals [stalking] other inmates in the showers".

According to a study by Human Rights Watch, however, "The myth of the 'homosexual predator' is groundless. Perpetrators of rape typically view themselves as heterosexual and, outside of the prison environment, prefer to engage in heterosexual activity. Although gay inmates are much more likely than other inmates to be victimized in prison, they are not likely to be perpetrators of sexual abuse." (see also situational homosexuality)

A related problem is that there is a tendency, among both prison officials and prisoners, to view victimization as proof of homosexuality: "The fact of submitting to rape—even violent, forcible rape—redefines [a prisoner] as 'a punk, sissy, queer.'" Officials sometimes take the view all sex involving a gay prisoner is necessarily consensual, meaning that victims known or perceived to be gay may not receive necessary medical treatment, protection, and legal recourse, and perpetrators may go unpunished and remain able to perpetrate abuse on their victims.

According to Andrea Cavanaugh Kern, a spokesperson for Stop Prisoner Rape, the combination of high rates of sexual assault against gay prisoners and high rates of HIV infection in the prison population is "a life-or-death issue for the LGBT community".

While much of the data regards male prisoners, according to Amnesty International, "perceived or actual sexual orientation has been found to be one of four categories that make a female prisoner a more likely target for sexual abuse". It wasn't until 2003 that PREA (Prison Rape Elimination Act) was enacted by United States Congress to aid in the prevention of sexual abuse and misconduct.

V-coding

A 2018 report from the Indiana Maurer University School of Law found that it was common for trans women placed in men's prisons to be assigned to cells with aggressive cisgender male cellmates as both a reward and a means of placation for said cellmates, so as to maintain social control and to, as one inmate described it, "keep the violence rate down". Trans women used in this manner are often raped daily. This process is known as "V-coding", and has been described as so common that it is effectively "a central part of a trans woman's sentence".

The report also found it common for correctional officers to publicly strip search trans women inmates, before putting their bodies on display for not only the other correctional officers, but for the other prisoners. Trans women in this situation are sometimes made to dance, present, or masturbate at the CO's discretion.

The prisoners serving as customers for these women are informally referred to as "husbands". Trans women who physically resist the customer's advances are often criminally charged with assault and placed in solitary confinement, the assault charge then being used to extend the woman's prison stay and deny her parole.

Colombia 
In 2019, la Defensoría del Pueblo identified 285 cases of violence and discrimination against LGBTI prisoners. Over a third of these victims were transgender. One-eighth were Venezuelan.

Segregation
For their own safety, LGBT people in prison are sometimes placed in administrative segregation or protective custody. Although homosexuality is "generally regarded as a factor supporting an inmate's claim to protective custody", homophobia among prison officials and a misperception among many guards that "when a gay inmate has sex with another man it is somehow by definition consensual" mean that access to such custody is not always easy or available.

Another problem is that protective and disciplinary custody are often the same, which means that prisoners in "protective housing" are often held with the most violent inmates in highly restrictive and isolated settings—sometimes in more or less permanent lockdown or solitary confinement—that prevent them from participating in drug treatment, education and job-training programs, from having contact with other prisoners or outside visitors, or from enjoying privileges such as the right to watch television, listen to the radio, or even to leave their cells. The degree of safety that protective custody provides depends on the facilities. Protective custody can provide a secure environment that is free from violence by other prisoners or it can isolate prisoners, and position them with a higher risk of violence by a correctional officer. Although the protective custody can offer some level of protection, the harmful physical and psychological impacts of isolation show that it is an unwanted alternative to assignment in the general population.

In other cases, institutions may have special areas (known by such nicknames as the "queerentine", "gay tank", "queen tank", or "softie tank") for housing vulnerable inmates such as LGBT people, elderly or disabled prisoners, or informers.

LGBT Prison Segregation in the United States 
In San Francisco, for example, transgender inmates are automatically segregated from other prisoners. Nevertheless, according to Eileen Hirst, San Francisco Sheriff's Chief of Staff, being gay is not in itself enough to justify a request for protective housing: inmates requesting such housing must demonstrate that they are vulnerable.

For financial or other reasons segregated housing is not always available. For instance at Rikers Island, New York City's largest jail, the segregated unit for LGBT prisoners, known as "gay housing", was closed in December 2005 citing a need to improve security. The unit had opened in the 1970s due to concerns about abuse of LGBT prisoners in pretrial detention. The New York City Department of Corrections' widely criticised plan was to restructure the classification of prisoners and create a new protective custody system which would include 23-hour-per-day lockdown (identical to that mandated for disciplinary reasons) or moving vulnerable inmates to other facilities. Whereas formerly all that was required was a declaration of homosexuality or the appearance of being transgender, inmates wanting protective custody would now be required to request it in a special hearing.

Solitary confinement

Solitary confinement has become the prison system's preferred method to protect transgender inmates from other prisoners in cases involving sexual assault, harassment and physical violence. Advocates for transgender prisoners argue that this method only increases the harassment they receive from officers and various other staff members as reported by Injustice at Every Turn.

Solitary Confinement in the United States 
In the report, 44% of transgender male respondents and 40% of transgender women respondents who were imprisoned reported being harassed by officers and/or other staff members of the prison system. While in solitary confinement, transgender individuals are less likely to receive medical care.

Out of the respondents in the same report 12% of transgender individuals surveyed reported being denied routine non-transition related healthcare and 17% reported being denied hormone treatment. The number was disproportionately higher when transgender people of color reported lack of transition health care and hormone treatment with American Indians reporting 36% denial and Black and/or African American reporting a 30% denial rate. The use of solitary confinement also lessens transgender inmate's access to programs and work assignments where they may be able to lessen their sentences, enter rehabilitation programs, or earn money to buy basic products such as soap and also lessens their chances to obtain parole or conditional release.

Solitary confinement has also shown to affect the mental health of transgender prisoners. With the report of filed by Injustice at Every Turn, 41% of respondents reported attempted suicide. With transgender people of color, 56% of American Indian and 54% of multiracial individuals reported attempted suicide. The report also links the over-use of solitary confinement as a factor in the high rate of suicide attempts by transgender people of color within the prison system.

In addition to the conditions themselves amounting to torture, solitary confinement usually restricts a person's access to education, work, and program opportunities. While mental health is a key priority and emphasis for inmates subjected to solitary confinement, there are other discriminatory disadvantages that come with it as well. For example, education and work programs are often essential prerequisites to achieving good time and parole. This means that many LGBT people, who are more likely to be placed in solitary confinement, are also less likely to be paroled or released early, forcing them to serve out their maximum sentences. Activists argue that members of the LGBT community should have equal access to prison programs and services, a right protected and provided for under the Fourteenth Amendment of the U.S. Constitution.

According to Title IX of the Education Amendments, discrimination on the basis of sex is illegal. Many education programs in prisons, jails, and juvenile detention centers are funded by the Federal government and those who take funding from the government must adhere to the full tenets of these amendments. Title IX extends to protect inmates who are denied access to prison programs and resources because of their gender identity or sexual orientation. The Fourteenth Amendment asserts that all inmates should have equal access to libraries, educational programs, the internet, and corresponding resources.

Solitary Confinement in Canada 
In cases where the incarcerated are assigned to prisons based on sex, rather than their gender-identity, complete segregation is often seen as the only viable way for ensuring safety. In the case of Synthia Kavanagh, she was assigned to a male institution despite explicit recommendations from the trial judge. As a result, Kavanagh was "placed in segregation over extended periods of her incarceration for the purpose of protection from self-harm or abuse by others. Segregation for prolonged periods is not only inhuman but [is additionally] unconducive to any prospect of stabilization or rehabilitation."

Support for LGBT people in prison

As a result of the rise of awareness of LGBT persons in prisons, many organizations have developed specifically to support LGBT people in the prison system. These organizations address the various needs surrounding specific issues that LGBT persons in the prison system face. Some organizations also support family members of LGBTQ inmates.

Black and Pink is an American organization that is composed of "LGBTQ prisoners and 'free world' allies" who focus on prison abolishment movement and support LGBTQ prison inmates and their families. The organization offers various services such as court accompaniment, a pen pal program, workshops and training, and support for LGBTQ persons who are experiencing sexual violence, harassment, or lack of health care.

LGBT Books to Prisoners is donation-funded, volunteer-run, non-profit support group based in Madison, WI. It sends books and other educational materials, free of charge, to incarcerated LGBT people across the United States. Since its founding in 2008, the organization has sent materials to almost 9,000 people.

The Prison Activists Resource Center also provides information for organizations that are dedicated solely for LGBT Prisoners, such as Hearts on a Wire which is a Pennsylvania-based organization focused on helping Transgender individuals. Other listed resources include GLBTQ Advocates and Defenders (GLAD) and LGBT Books to Prisoners. These sources either provide links for possible legal assistance, or provide materials in an attempt to make the prison experience more bearable.

See also

 Homelessness among LGBT youth in the United States
 Intersex human rights
 LGBT people in American prisons
 LGBT rights by country or territory
 Prison sexuality
 Prisoners' rights
 Sodomy laws in the United States
 Transgender Archives at the University of Victoria

Notes

References

Further reading

Suhomlinova, O. and O’Shea, S. (2021), "Doubly Imprisoned: Transgender and Non-binary Prisoners’ Experiences in England and Wales", Johnson, A.H., Rogers, B.A. and Taylor, T. (Ed.) Advances in Trans Studies: Moving Toward Gender Expansion and Trans Hope (Advances in Gender Research, Vol. 32), Emerald Publishing Limited, Bingley, pp. 125-139. https://doi.org/10.1108/S1529-212620210000032009

LGBT rights
LGBT and society
Penology
Persecution of LGBT people
Prisoners and detainees
Prison sexuality